Donald Frederick Perry (March 16, 1930 – April 15, 2019) was a Canadian ice hockey defenceman and coach.

Biography 
Perry, born  in Edmonton, Alberta, began his playing career with Edmonton area junior league teams. He broke into professional hockey in 1950 with the Boston Olympics, and in 1954, he started a long tenure as player-coach with the New Haven Blades of the Eastern Hockey League. Perry's teams were skilled, in 1956 winning the only professional sports championship the city has had.  However, they gained a reputation for their physical play that often included fisticuffs. Perry retired from the ice in 1969 with over 600 points in excess of 1000 games at the blue line. He continued to coach the Blades until 1972.

From 1972 until 1981, Perry coached the Saginaw Gears of the International Hockey League. His teams won two Turner Cup championships (1977 & 1981). In 1981, he was hired to coach the New Haven Nighthawks of the American Hockey League, but he held this position for only half a season before he replaced Parker MacDonald behind the Los Angeles Kings' bench. Just weeks into his tenure with the Kings, Perry was suspended for six games for ordering enforcer Paul Mulvey to leave the bench to join a fight.

Perry would guide the Kings to the playoffs in 1982, a postseason that included the famous Miracle on Manchester comeback against the Edmonton Oilers. However, he failed to make the playoffs in 1983 and was fired midway through the 1984 campaign. He continued his career as a Professional Scout for the LA Kings for more than 10 years before retiring to his long-time home in Hague-on-Lake-George, NY and, subsequently in Green Valley, AZ where he died at a nursing home on April 15, 2019 at the age of 89.

NHL coaching record

References

External links

1930 births
2019 deaths
Boston Olympics players
Canadian ice hockey coaches
Canadian ice hockey players
Los Angeles Kings coaches
New Haven Blades players
Ice hockey people from Edmonton